Safi Quli is a Turkic-derived Muslim male given name built from quli.

Safiqoli Khan
Safiqoli Khan (son of Rostam Khan)
Safiqoli Khan Undiladze

Turkic masculine given names